The Can Kickers are an Americana band based out of New London, Connecticut.  The group formed in 2000 while the members were attending Connecticut College.

Career
The Can Kickers are an Americana band based in New London, Connecticut.   According to the Huntsville Times, The Can Kickers sound like "the Carter family meets the Ramones."  They have toured Germany, the United States, Ireland, Mexico, and the Netherlands. On January 31, 2006 the band's live show in Philadelphia was recorded for a live CD and released on Fistolo Records.  The Can Kickers played their 500th show in September 2006 at the El 'n' Gee in New London.

The Can Kickers played over 30 shows on their Mexican tour and travelled with Polka Madre y La Comezon.   While touring in Mexico their van was pulled over 17 times.  During this 2007 Mexican tour, of their show in Guadalajara, Mural said that they and Polka Madre were a "perfect combination which mixes such quite distinct styles as polka with a punk attitude."

They are represented on the 2006 compilation album Towers of New London, Vol. 4: Eminent Domain (Cosmodemonic Telegraph) with the song "Johnny Walker".

Members 
 Doug Schaefer – drums, washboard, vocals
 Daniel Spurr – banjo, gitfiddle, vocals (yodeling)
 Daniel Thompson – fiddle, mouth organ, jawharp

Discography 
Cds
Dead Music I
Dead Music II, 2002
Mountain Dudes, 2003
Fire in the East, Fire in the West, 2005
We're Dying But We Ain't Dead, 2006
Live at Lavazone, 2007
7-inch vinyl
Fire in the East, Fire in the West, 2002 (Arkam Records)
Dark Molly, 2007 (Arkam Records)

References

External links 
 The Can Kickers - Official Site
 Cosmodemonic Telegraph
 Pinewoods Camp
 Interview with TLChicken
 “Old-timey Riot Music for Dancing”: The Can Kickers, EconoCulture

Musical groups from Connecticut
American alternative country groups
American bluegrass music groups
Old-time bands
Musicians from New London, Connecticut
2000 establishments in the United States
Folk punk groups
Musical groups established in 2000